Barekamavan is a village in the Noyemberyan Municipality of the Tavush Province of Armenia.

Toponymy 
The village was previously known as Kurumsulu and Dostlu.

References

External links 

Populated places in Tavush Province